Indigenous rights are those rights that exist in recognition of the specific condition of the Indigenous peoples. This includes not only the most basic human rights of physical survival and integrity, but also the rights over their land (including native title), language, religion, and other elements of cultural heritage that are a part of their existence and identity as a people. This can be used as an expression for advocacy of social organizations, or form a part of the national law in establishing the relation between a government and the right of self-determination among its Indigenous people, or in international law as a protection against violation of Indigenous rights by actions of governments or groups of private interests.

Definition and historical background 
Indigenous rights belong to those who, being indigenous peoples, are defined by being the original people of a land that has been conquered and colonized by outsiders. 

Exactly who is a part of the indigenous peoples is disputed, but can broadly be understood in relation to colonialism. When we speak of indigenous peoples we speak of those pre-colonial societies that face a specific threat from this phenomenon of occupation, and the relation that these societies have with the colonial powers. The exact definition of who are the indigenous people, and the consequent state of rightsholders, varies. Being too inclusive is considered as bad as being non-inclusive. 

In the context of modern indigenous people of European colonial powers, the recognition of indigenous rights can be traced to at least the period of Renaissance. Along with the justification of colonialism with a higher purpose for both the colonists and colonized, some voices expressed concern over the way indigenous peoples were treated and the effect it had on their societies. In the Spanish Empire, the crown established the General Indian Court in Mexico and in Peru, with jurisdiction over cases involving the indigenous and aimed at protecting Indians from ill-treatment. Indians' access to the court was enabled by a small tax which paid for legal aides.

The issue of indigenous rights is also associated with other levels of human struggle. Due to the close relationship between indigenous peoples' cultural and economic situations and their environmental settings, indigenous rights issues are linked with concerns over environmental change and sustainable development. According to scientists and organizations like the Rainforest Foundation, the struggle for indigenous peoples is essential for solving the problem of reducing carbon emission, and approaching the threat on both cultural and biological diversity in general.

Representation
The rights, claims and even identity of indigenous peoples are apprehended, acknowledged and observed quite differently from government to government. Various organizations exist with charters to in one way or another promote (or at least acknowledge) indigenous aspirations, and indigenous societies have often banded together to form bodies which jointly seek to further their communal interests.

International organizations 

There are several non-governmental civil society movements, networks, indigenous and non-indigenous organizations whose founding mission is to protect indigenous rights, including land rights. These organizations, networks and groups underline that the problems that indigenous peoples are facing is the lack of recognition that they are entitled to live the way they choose, and lack of the right to their lands and territories. Their mission is to protect the rights of indigenous peoples without states imposing their ideas of "development". These groups say that each indigenous culture is differentiated,  rich of religious believe systems, way of life, sustenance and arts, and that the root of  problem would be the interference with their way of living by state's disrespect to their rights, as well as the invasion of traditional lands by multinational corporations and small businesses for exploitation of natural resources.

United Nations

Indigenous peoples and their interests are represented in the United Nations primarily through the mechanisms of the Working Group on Indigenous Populations. In April 2000 the United Nations Commission on Human Rights adopted a resolution to establish the United Nations Permanent Forum on Indigenous Issues (PFII) as an advisory body to the Economic and Social Council with a mandate to review indigenous issues.

In late December 2004, the United Nations General Assembly proclaimed 2005–2014 to be the Second International Decade of the World's Indigenous People. The main goal of the new decade will be to strengthen international cooperation around resolving the problems faced by indigenous peoples in areas such as culture, education, health, human rights, the environment, and social and economic development.

In September 2007, after a process of preparations, discussions and negotiations stretching back to 1982, the General Assembly adopted the Declaration on the Rights of Indigenous Peoples. The non-binding declaration outlines the individual and collective rights of indigenous peoples, as well as their rights to identity, culture, language, employment, health, education and other issues. Four nations with significant indigenous populations voted against the declaration: the United States, Canada, New Zealand and Australia. All four have since then changed their vote in favour. Eleven nations abstained: Azerbaijan, Bangladesh, Bhutan, Burundi, Colombia, Georgia, Kenya, Nigeria, Russia, Samoa and Ukraine. Thirty-four nations did not vote, while the remaining 143 nations voted for it.

ILO 169

ILO 169 is a convention of the International Labour Organization. Once ratified by a state, it is meant to work as a law protecting tribal people's rights. There are twenty-two physical survival and integrity, but also the preservation of their land, language and religion rights. The ILO represents indigenous rights as they are the organisation that enforced instruments the deal with indigenous rights exclusively.

Organization of American States
Since 1997, the nations of the Organization of American States have been discussing draft versions of a proposed American Declaration on the Rights of Indigenous Peoples. "The draft declaration is currently one of the most important processes underway with regard to indigenous rights in the Americas" as mentioned by the International Work Group for Indigenous Affairs.

By country

Australia

Canada

In Canada "Aboriginal rights" are those rights that Indigenous peoples enjoy as a result of their ancestors' long occupancy of the land, for example the right to hunt and fish a particular territory.  These are distinct from "treaty rights" which are enumerated in specific agreements between Indigenous groups and the state.  Both treaty rights and Aboriginal rights are protected by Section 35 of the Canadian constitution of 1982.

Denmark

The Indigenous people of Greenland gained home rule in 1979 and extended to self-government in 2009.

Secession
Indigenous peoples have a mere "remedial" right to secession in international law, irrespective of their right of self-determination and self-government, leaving the existence of rights of secession to internal laws of sovereign states, and independence to the capacities of states.

See also

Bioregionalism
Bumiputra
Cultural diversity
Cultural imperialism
Indigenous intellectual property
Indigenous land rights
International Day of the World's Indigenous Peoples
Free, prior and informed consent
Jus sanguinis
Minority rights
Nativism
Survival International
Xenophobia

References

External links

The Rights of Indigenous Peoples: Study Guide – University of Minnesota
Researching Indigenous People's Rights Under International Law – Steven C. Perkins
Indigenous Rights – International Encyclopedia of the Social Sciences, 2nd Edition
United Nations Declaration on the Rights of Indigenous Peoples
ILO Convention 169 (full text) - Current international law on Indigenous peoples
State of The World's Indigenous Peoples – UN report, First Issue, 2009
Genocide Lewis, Norman, February 1969 - Article that led to the foundation of several prominent Indigenous rights organizations
 Conservation and Community Rights: Lessons from Mesoamerica

 
Indigenous politics
History of social movements